Tarjei Aase Omenås (born 2 February 1992) is a Norwegian football goalkeeper who last played for Aalesund.

He hails from Ålesund, but joined Lyn as a junior.

References

1992 births
Living people
Sportspeople from Ålesund
Norwegian footballers
Eliteserien players
Norwegian First Division players
Lyn Fotball players
Skeid Fotball players
Hønefoss BK players
Strømmen IF players
Sogndal Fotball players
Aalesunds FK players
Association football goalkeepers